(also known as Sakugawa Koshiki Shōrinji-ryū Karatedō) is a form of karate derived from the teachings of Kanga Sakukawa.

References

External links
World Shorinji-Ryu Karate Federation 

Karate
Japanese martial arts